Aglaia, Aglaïa, Aglaja, or Aglaya may refer to:

People and mythical figures 
 Aglaia or Aglaea (mythology)
 Saint Aglaia of Rome, 4th century, a companion of Saint Boniface

Science 
 Aglaia, a genus of trees in the mahogany family
 The butterfly genus Aglais (Dalman, 1816)
 47 Aglaja, an asteroid

Theatre 
 , a ballet by Filippo Taglioni.
 Aglaia, an opera by Heitor Villa-Lobos

Other uses
 Aglaia (given name)
 , an 18th-century British ship

See also
 Aglaja (disambiguation)
 Aglae (disambiguation)